Arturo Fernández may refer to:
Arturo Fernández Rodríguez (1929–2019), Spanish actor 
Arturo Fernández Meyzán (1906–1999), Peruvian football defender
Arturo Rodríguez Fernández (1948–2010), author, film critic, and playwright from the Dominican Republic